Pinheyschna meruensis is a species of dragonfly in the family Aeshnidae. It is found in Kenya, Tanzania, and Uganda. Its natural habitats are subtropical or tropical dry forests, subtropical or tropical moist lowland forests, subtropical or tropical dry shrubland, rivers, and intermittent rivers.

References

Aeshnidae
Insects described in 1909
Taxa named by Bror Yngve Sjöstedt
Taxonomy articles created by Polbot
Odonata of Africa